Mar Sebastian Valloppilly (4 August 1911 – 4 April 2006) was the first bishop of the Diocese of Tellicherry (1953–1989), in Kerala, India. He was a Gandhian philosopher.

Notes

1911 births
2006 deaths
Malayali people
Christian clergy from Kottayam
Syro-Malabar archbishops
Founders of Indian schools and colleges
Gandhians